The Hong Kong Ballet is a classical ballet company founded in 1979.

History 

The company was created in 1979.

Since 1997, The Hong Kong Ballet has concluded more than 30 tours to 10 countries in North and South America, Europe and Asia.

In January 2010, Faye Leung, the company's former top ballerina, revealed in a book that she was sacked from the HK Ballet on suspicious that she was dividing dancers and organizing a strike.

In June 2010, the Company took part in Expo 2010 Shanghai, presenting a mixed bill production and performing as part of Festive Hong Kong Celebration.  The Hong Kong Ballet’s dancers also performed at the 4th and 5th International Dance Festivals held in Cali, Colombia; the 50th Anniversary International Gala in Brisbane, Australia; and the International Ballettgala XI in Dortmund, Germany. Most recently, the Company presented Firecracker in Macau in January 2012. In the summer of 2012, The Hong Kong Ballet toured the United States and Canada with a mixed bill featuring two specially commissioned contemporary ballets. The company made its debut appearance at Jacob’s Pillow Dance Festival and then performed in Aspen, Montreal and Santa Fe.

In October 2013, the company was accused of self-censorship during a production of The Dream of Red Chamber. Originally shown at the end of the ballet, the 12-minute projection sequence depicted different stages in China's history. In the part depicting the Cultural Revolution, dancers in Red Guards uniforms waved copies of Mao Ze Dong's little red book. Following the premiere, the sequence was cut from the show. Wang Xinpeng, the choreographer, claimed he did not agree with the deletion of the scene.

In June 2017, Septime Webre, of Cuban-American origins, previously the artistic director of The Washington Ballet for 17 years, was named Artistic Director of the Ballet. For 2018, he planned a contemporary program which featured the music of the Beatles. He also organized Ballet in the City, outdoors dancing events in different art galleries of the city, and a series of other events "to insert the company and its dancers into the social fabric of the city".

Description

Repertoire 

The Company performs a repertoire that combines 19th to 21st century classical, contemporary works and newly commissioned ballets. This repertoire reflects both the heritage and origin of ballet in Europe as well as contemporary influences, and includes commissions focused on Hong Kong’s culture and history, such as Firecracker by local choreographer Yuri Ng. The company’s repertoire encompasses full-length ballets such as Swan Lake, The Sleeping Beauty, The Nutcracker and Giselle, and the finest classical and neo-classical works of the 20th and the 21st centuries, including George Balanchine's Rubies and Tchaikovsky Pas de Deux; Rudi van Dantzig's Romeo and Juliet; Ronald Hynd's The Merry Widow and Coppélia; and Wang Xin Pang’s Serenade and Pas de Six from Mozart. The company has also performed contemporary ballets such as William Forsythe's Steptext, Nils Christe’s Symphony in Three Movements, Stephen Mills's Hush, and Stanton Welch's Clear. The Hong Kong Ballet's commissions include Natalie Weir's Turandot, and Stephen Baynes's The Way Alone.

Company 

The Hong Kong Ballet has an artistic team of over 40 dancers. The majority of the dancers are from China, others are international recruits.

 Artistic Director – Septime Webre (since June 2017)
 Chief Representative, Mainland, China – Tang Min
 Ballet Master - Luis R. Torres
 Ballet Master - Yuh Egami
 Associate Ballet Master - Wei Wei
 Guest Ballet Master – Liang Jing
 Choreographer-in-Residence: Hu Song Wei Ricky
 Pianist – Nicholas Lau
 Sports Practitioner - Arlene Mackinlay

Principal dancers

Soloists

Retired dancers

Leave dancers

See also 
 Shanghai Ballet Company

References

External links
 Official website

Arts in Hong Kong
Ballet companies in China